"Seven Days and One Week" is a song by Italian-French electronic music act B.B.E. It was released in July 1996 as the lead single from their debut album, Games (1996). As a representative of the short-lived dream house sound, the song became a top 10 hit worldwide, most notably reaching number-one in Spain, number two in Belgium, Finland, Ireland and Italy, and number three in Germany, the Netherlands and the United Kingdom. On the Eurochart Hot 100, it also peaked at number three.

Critical reception
James Hyman from Music Weeks RM Dance Update rated the song five out of five, declaring it an "obvious dreamhouse successor" to Robert Miles' "Children". He added, "With its 'Shinny/Elevator' pace, jolting stabs, rapid rolls and tinkly piano, Emmanuel Top and the Italian Bruno duo, who are no strangers to this style ('Age of Love'), have created a trump (trouser) trancer. Previously top five in Germany and number one in Spain, expect to see this in a UK Top 10 chart neat you soon."

Music video
The accompanying music video for "Seven Days and One Week" was directed by German music video and film director Martin Weisz.

Impact and legacy
In 2014, Jeffrey Sutorius from Dutch electronic music group Dash Berlin ranked the song at number four in his list of "Dash Berlin's Top Five Trance Classics". He said:

Track listing
 CD maxi - Europe (1996) "Seven Days and One Week" (Radio Mix)	- 4:30
 "Seven Days and One Week" (Club Mix) - 8:20
 "Hypnose" - 5:15

 File, MP3 - UK (2018)'
 "Seven Days and One Week" (Yotto Extended Mix) - 7:59

Charts and certifications

Weekly charts

Year-end charts

Certifications

Other
The short-puzzle game Block Manouveres has this track (Tune 4, tutorial music).

References

1996 singles
1996 songs
Trance songs
Number-one singles in Spain
Music videos directed by Martin Weisz